The Victor is a drainage mill in Wanswerd (West Frisian: Wânswert), Friesland, Netherlands. The mill is listed as a Rijksmonument, number 15644.

History
In 1867, De Victor was built to replace 6 smaller drainage mills and 3 tjaskers. The mill was taken over by Stichting De Fryske Mole in 1975 and restored in 1977 when the original Patent Sails were replaced by common sails. In 2006 the windmill was designated as a reserve for emergency situations.
The mill is currently awaiting restoration, among which repairs to its foundations, expecting to start in spring 2012.

Description

The Victor is what the Dutch describe as an "achtkante grondzeiler". It is a smock mill without a stage, the sails reaching almost to the ground. The brick base is one storey high with a three-storey smock on top. Both smock and cap are thatched. The mill is winded by tailpole and winch. The cap is carried on 16 fixed cast-iron rollers instead of the in the Netherlands common wooden blocks or unfixed rollers moving along a rail, meaning the entire weight of the cap and sails is carried by the axles of the rollers.

A 22 hp Lister HA diesel engine, once used as auxiliary power, is still in situ in the mill but is no longer connected to the Archimedes' screw.

Public access
The mill is open to the public by appointment.

References

External links
Website (dutch)

Windmills in Friesland
Smock mills in the Netherlands
Rijksmonuments in Friesland
Windmills completed in 1867
Octagonal buildings in the Netherlands